Dracaena angolensis, synonym Sansevieria cylindrica, also known as the cylindrical snake plant, African spear or spear sansevieria or in Brazil Saint Bárbara sword,  is a succulent plant native to Angola.  Formerly in the genus Sansevieria, it is now included in Dracaena.

Description
Dracaena angolensis has striped, elongate, smooth, greenish-gray subcylindrical leaves. The spear sansevieria grows fan-shaped, with its stiff leaves growing from a basal rosette. 

The species is interesting in having subcylindrical instead of strap-shaped leaves caused by a failure to express genes which would cause the cylindrical bud to differentiate dorsoventrally or produce a distinctive and familiar top and bottom surface to the leaf blade.  The  greenish-white tubular flowers are tinged with pink.

Cultivation
The species is drought-tolerant and in cultivation requires water only about once every other week during the growing season. The species can be watered once a month during the winter months. The species was described by Wenceslas Bojer in 1837. Dracaena angolensis (under the synonym Sansevieria cylindrica) received its common name from a competition in a Dutch national newspaper. It is popular as an ornamental plant as it is easy to culture and take care of in a home if given bright sunlight and other required resources.

Gallery of varieties and cultivars

References

External links
 Caring for Sansevieria cylindrica
 African Spear—How to Grow Sansevieria Cylindrica
 CalPhotos

angolensis
Flora of Angola
House plants
Taxa named by Élie-Abel Carrière